Mano Ya Na Mano is a show inspired by true incidents that took place in various places in India.

Episodes

Season 1

Season 2

References

External links
 Official website
 
 
 

2006 Indian television series debuts
Indian television series
Star One (Indian TV channel) original programming